Kamil Wacławczyk (born 29 March 1987) is a Polish professional footballer who plays as a midfielder for Górnik Polkowice.

Honours
Górnik Polkowice
II liga: 2020–21

References

External links
 

1987 births
People from Lubin
Sportspeople from Lower Silesian Voivodeship
Living people
Polish footballers
Association football midfielders
Górnik Polkowice players
GKS Bełchatów players
Bytovia Bytów players
Ekstraklasa players
I liga players
II liga players
III liga players